The Bill Stutt Stakes is a Moonee Valley Racing Club Group 2 Thoroughbred horse race for horses aged three years old, under open set weight conditions, over a distance of 1600 metres, held annually at Moonee Valley Racecourse, Melbourne, Australia. Total prize money for the race is A$300,000.

History
The race was renamed in honour of Bill Stutt, a former chairman of the Moonee Valley Racing Club.

1944 racebook

Distance
1934–1971 -  1 mile (approx. 1600m)
1972 onwards - 1600 metres with exceptions
1986, 1990, 1993 - 1614 metres
1989 - 1619 metres

Grade
1934–1978 was a Principal Race
1979 onwards Group 2

Name
1934–1989 - Moonee Valley Stakes
1990 onwards - Bill Stutt Stakes

Winners

 2021 - Forgot You
 2020 - Glenfiddich
 2019 - The Holy One
 2018 - Leonardo Da Hinchi
 2017 - Showtime
 2016 - Hey Doc
 2015 - Sovereign Nation
 2014 - Almalad
 2013 - Divine Calling
 2012 - Pierro
 2011 - Chase The Rainbow
 2010 - Hollowlea
 2009 - Carrara
 2008 - Whobegotyou
 2007 - Barbaricus
 2006 - Churchill Downs
 2005 - Red Dazzler
 2004 - Mr. Martini
 2003 - Casual Pass
 2002 - Helenus
 2001 - Viscount
 2000 - Sarason Trail
 1999 - Diatribe
 1998 - †Helm / St. Clemens Belle
 1997 - Schubert
 1996 - Encosta De Lago
 1995 - Burrito
 1994 - Blevic
 1993 - Pearl Prince
 1992 - Bundy Lad
 1991 - Ready To Explode
 1990 - Canny Lad
 1989 - Zabeel
 1988 - Almurtajaz
 1987 - Sky Chase
 1986 - Broad Reach
 1985 - Wellington Hammer
 1984 - Red Anchor
 1983 - Albany Bay
 1982 - Holsam
 1981 - Fearless Pride
 1980 - Glenson
 1979 - Rumour-Qui
 1978 - Karaman
 1977 - Guns Away
 1976 - Surround
 1975 - Denise’s Joy
 1974 - Plush
 1973 - Taj Rossi
 1972 - Century
 1971 - Beau Sovereign
 1970 - Eastern Court
 1969 - Daryl's Joy
 1968 - Always There
 1967 - Fileur
 1966 - Storm Queen
 1965 - Star Affair
 1964 - L’Orage Boy
 1963 - Proteus
 1962 - Fuel
 1961 - New Statesman
 1960 - Lady Sybil
 1959 - Mardene
 1958 - San Remo
 1957 - Gay Saba
 1956 - Arab’s Choice
 1955 - French Charm
 1954 - Spritsail
 1953 - Walu
 1952 - Lenity
 1951 - Friar’s Hope
 1950 - Beau Avion
 1949 - St. Comedy
 1948 - Phoibos
 1947 - Chanak
 1946 - Bold Beau
 1945 - Attley
 1944 - Bootle
 1943 - Precept
 1942 - Leahero
 1941 - Skipton
 1940 - Sun Valley
 1939 - Pure Gold
 1938 - Cassio
 1937 - Lochlee
 1936 - Silver Reign
 1935 - Valiant Chief
 1934 - Titanium

† Dead heat

See also
 List of Australian Group races
 Group races

References

Horse races in Australia